Corin is a given name in English deriving from the Latin Quirinus, a Roman god. The meaning is unclear but is probably associated with "spear". The name is that of a character in William Shakespeare's As You Like It. It is also used as a family name.

First name
Corin is a masculine or feminine given name.
Corin Hewitt (born 1971), American sculptor and photographer
Corin Mellor (born 1966), British designer
Corin Nemec (born 1971), American actor
Corin Redgrave (1939–2010), British actor and political activist
Corin Thunderfist, fictional character and twin of Cor in The Chronicles of Narnia
Corin Tucker (born 1972), American singer and guitarist

Surname
Jaclyn Corin, American activist and advocate for gun control
Joshua Corin, American writer
Lucy Corin, American writer
William Corin (1867–1929), Australian electrical engineer

Related names
Corina, including Corine and Coreen
Korin (disambiguation)
Corran (disambiguation)
Chorin (surname)

References

Given names
English-language unisex given names
English-language feminine given names
English-language masculine given names
English-language surnames
Surnames of British Isles origin
Surnames of English origin
Surnames of Scottish origin